Kaczory  is a town in Piła County, Greater Poland Voivodeship, in west-central Poland. It is the seat of the gmina (administrative district) called Gmina Kaczory.

The village has a population of 2,743.

References

Villages in Piła County